Lapo Gianni (died after 1328) was an Italian poet who lived in Florence in the 13th-14th centuries. He was a member of the Florentine circle of the Italian movement called Dolce Stil Novo, and was probably a notary. His composition are distinguished for lightness and originality. Of him eleven ballads and six songs remain. Lapo Gianni is also cited by Dante Alighieri (to whom he was a friend, together with Guido Cavalcanti) in the famous 9th sonnet of the Rhymes.

References

External links
 

13th-century births
14th-century deaths
Italian poets
Italian male poets